The 2009 Asian Championship of Ski Mountaineering was the second edition of an Asian Championship of Ski Mountaineering.

The event was organized by the Asia Ski Mountaineering Federation (ASMF), and was the first officially sanctioned Asian Championship by the new International Ski Mountaineering Federation (ISMF), which emerged from the ISMC in 2008. At this edition a vertical race and a relay race was added. So that the few female ski mountaineers could also participate in the relay race event, the teams were mixed with at least one female racer.

The championship was held at the Beidahu ski ressort in the Chinese Nagano Prefecture from February 10 to February 13, 2009. Participating were racers from China, South Korea and Japan.

Results

Vertical race 
Event held on February 11, 2009; participating where racers from China, South Korea and Japan; course length: 720 metres

List of the best 10 participants by gender:

Individual 
Event held on February 12, 2009; course length: 1.900 metres; course of the female racers was 300 metres shortened

List of the best 10 participants by gender:

Relay 
Event held on February 12, 2009; mixed teams of at least one female (f) racer

References 

2007
Asian Ski Mountaineering Championship
Asian Ski Mountaineering Championship
Asian Championship of Ski Mountaineering
Asian Championship of Ski Mountaineering 2009
February 2009 sports events in China